Stains-all is a carbocyanine dye, which stains anionic proteins, nucleic acids, anionic polysaccharides and other anionic molecules.

Properties 
Stains-all is metachromatic and changes its color dependent on its contact to other molecules. The detection limit for phosphoproteins is below 1 ng after one hour of staining, for anionic polysaccharides between 10 and 500 ng. Highly anionic proteins are stained blue, proteoglycans purple and anionic proteins pink. RNA is stained blueish-purple with a detection limit of 90 ng and DNA is stained blue with a detection limit of 3 ng.

Stains-all is light sensitive, therefore the staining is performed in the absence of light and photographed immediately. Staining of proteins can be improved by a subsequent silver stain. The analogue Ethyl-Stains-all has similar properties as stains all, with differences in solubility and staining properties.

Applications 
Stains-all stains nucleic acids, anionic proteins, anionic polysaccharides such as alginate and pectinate, hyaluronic acid and dermatan sulfate, heparin, heparan sulfate and chondroitin sulfate. It is used in SDS-PAGE, agarose gel electrophoresis and histologic staining, e.g. staining of growth lines in bones.

References 

Thiazole dyes
Biochemistry methods
Histology